Sudhesan Midhun (born 7 October 1994) is an Indian cricketer who represents Kerala in domestic cricket. He is a right handed batter and right-handed legbreak googly bowler.

Early life
Midhun hails from Pullukulangara, near Kayamkulam in Alappuzha district of Kerala. His father, Sudhesan is a grocery shop owner. Midhun starred playing cricket at the age of 13 and has trained in Shot Cricket Club, Kandalloor and Travancore Cricket Academy, Kayamkulam.

Domestic career
In 2018, he picked up a hat-trick against Andhra Pradesh in the Under-23 BCCI tourney.

Midhun made his Twenty20 debut for Kerala in the 2017-18 Syed Mushtaq Ali Trophy on 11 January 2018 against Andhra Pradesh. He made his List A debut for Kerala in the 2017–18 Vijay Hazare Trophy on 7 February 2018 against Bengal. He made his first-class debut on 17 December 2019, for Kerala in the 2019–20 Ranji Trophy against Bengal.

He was the joint-highest wicket-taker of Kerala in the 2021-22 Syed Mushtaq Ali Trophy bagging eight wickets from 6 matches.

Indian Premier League

On 28 January 2018, he was signed by Rajasthan Royals in the 2018 Indian Premier League auction for ₹20 lakh. In  2019 Indian Premier League, he made his IPL debut for Rajasthan against Kolkata Knight Riders. He was released by the Rajasthan Royals ahead of the 2020 IPL auction.

International career

He was one of the seven reserve players for India's series against West Indies in 2022.

References

External links
 

1994 births
Living people
Indian cricketers
Kerala cricketers
Rajasthan Royals cricketers